The Phrygian cap or liberty cap is a soft conical cap with the apex bent over, associated in antiquity with several peoples in Eastern Europe and Anatolia, including the Persians, the Medes and the Scythians, as well as in the Balkans, Dacia, Thrace and in Phrygia, where the name originated. The oldest depiction of the Phrygian cap is from Persepolis in Iran.

Although Phrygian caps did not originally function as liberty caps, they came to signify freedom and the pursuit of liberty first in the American Revolution and then in the French Revolution, particularly as a symbol of jacobinism it has been also called a jacobin cap. The original cap of liberty was the Roman pileus, the felt cap of emancipated slaves of ancient Rome, which was an attribute of Libertas, the Roman goddess of liberty. In the 16th century, the Roman iconography of liberty was revived in emblem books and numismatic handbooks where the figure of Libertas is usually depicted with a pileus. The most extensive use of headgear as a symbol of freedom in the first two centuries after the revival of the Roman iconography was made in the Netherlands, where the cap of liberty was adopted in the form of a contemporary hat. In the 18th century, the traditional liberty cap was widely used in English prints, and from 1789 also in French prints; by the early 1790s, it was regularly used in the Phrygian form.

It is used in the coat of arms of certain republics or of republican state institutions in the place where otherwise a crown would be used (in the heraldry of monarchies). It thus came to be identified as a symbol of republican government. A number of national personifications, in particular France's Marianne, are commonly depicted wearing the Phrygian cap. Scientists pointed to the cultural and historical relationship of the Phrygian cap with the kurkhars – the national female headdress of the Ingush people.

In antiquity

In the Iranian world 

What came to be labelled as the Phrygian cap was originally used by several Iranian peoples, including the Scythians, the Medes, and the Persians. From the reports of the ancient Greeks, it appears that the Iranian variant also was a soft headdress and called a tiara. The Greeks identified one variant with their eastern neighbors and labeled it the “Phrygian cap”, although it was actually worn by nearly all Iranian tribes, from the Cappadocians (Old Persian Katpatuka) in the west to the Sakas (OPers. Sakā) in the northeast. This and other variants can be observed in the reliefs at Persepolis. All seem to have been made of soft material with long flaps over the ears and the neck, but the form of the top varies. The famous “upright (orthē) tiara” was worn by the king. Members of the Median upper class wore high, crested tiaras.

In the early Hellenistic world 
By the 4th century BCE (early Hellenistic period), the Phrygian cap was associated with Phrygian Attis, the consort of Cybele, the cult of which had by then become graecified. At around the same time, the cap appears in depictions of the legendary king Midas and other Phrygians in Greek vase-paintings and sculpture. Such images predate the earliest surviving literary references to the cap.

By extension, the Phrygian cap also came to be applied to several other non-Greek-speaking peoples ("barbarians" in the classical sense). Most notable of these extended senses of "Phrygian" were the Trojans and other western Anatolian peoples, who in Greek perception were synonymous with the Phrygians, and whose heroes Paris, Aeneas, and Ganymede were all regularly depicted with a Phrygian cap. Other Greek earthenware of antiquity also depict Amazons and so-called "Scythian" archers with Phrygian caps. Although these are military depictions, the headgear is distinguished from "Phrygian helmets" by long ear flaps, and the figures are also identified as "barbarians" by their trousers. The headgear also appears in 2nd-century BCE Boeotian Tanagra figurines of an effeminate Eros, and in various 1st-century BCE statuary of the Commagene, in eastern Anatolia. Greek representations of Thracians also regularly appear with Phrygian caps, most notably Bendis, the Thracian goddess of the Moon and the hunt, and Orpheus, a legendary Thracian poet and musician.

While the Phrygian cap was of wool or soft leather, in pre-Hellenistic times the Greeks had already developed a military helmet that had a similarly characteristic flipped-over tip. These so-called "Phrygian helmets" (named in modern times after the cap) were usually of bronze and in prominent use in Thrace, Dacia, Magna Graecia, and the rest of the Hellenistic world from the 5th century BCE up to Roman times. Due to their superficial similarity, the cap and helmet are often difficult to distinguish in Greek art (especially in black-figure or red-figure earthenware) unless the headgear is identified as a soft flexible cap by long earflaps or a long neck flap. Also confusingly similar are the depictions of the helmets used by cavalry and light infantry (cf. Peltasts of Thrace and Paeonia), whose headgear – aside from the traditional alopekis caps of fox skin – also included stiff leather helmets in imitation of the bronze ones.

In the Roman world 

The Greek concept passed to the Romans in its extended sense, and thus encompassed not only to Phrygians or Trojans (which the Romans also generally associated with the term "Phrygian"), but also the other near-neighbours of the Greeks. On Trajan's Column, which commemorated Trajan's epic wars with the Dacians (101–102 and 105–106 CE), the Phrygian cap adorns the heads of Dacian warriors. The prisoner, accompanying Trajan in the monumental, three meter tall statue of Trajan in the ancient city of Laodicea, is wearing a Phrygian cap. Parthians appear with Phrygian caps in the 2nd-century Arch of Septimius Severus, which commemorates Roman victories over the Parthian Empire. Likewise with Phrygians caps, but for Gauls, appear in 2nd-century friezes built into the 4th-century Arch of Constantine.

The Phrygian cap reappears in figures related to the first to fourth century religion of Mithraism. This astrology-centric Roman mystery cult (cultus) projected itself with pseudo-Oriental trappings (known as perserie in scholarship) in order to distinguish itself from both traditional Roman religion and from the other mystery cults. In the artwork of the cult (e.g. in the so-called "tauroctony" cult images), the figures of the god Mithras as well as those of his helpers Cautes and Cautopates are routinely depicted with a Phrygian cap. The function of the Phrygian cap in the cult are unknown, but it is conventionally identified as an accessory of its perserie.

Early Christian art (and continuing well into the Middle Ages) build on the same Greco-Roman perceptions of (Pseudo-)Zoroaster and his "Magi" as experts in the arts of astrology and magic, and routinely depict the "three wise men" (that follow a star) with Phrygian caps.

As a symbol of liberty

From Phrygian to liberty cap 
In late Republican Rome, a soft felt cap called the pileus served as a symbol of freemen (i.e. non-slaves), and was symbolically given to slaves upon manumission, thereby granting them not only their personal liberty, but also libertas – freedom as citizens, with the right to vote (if male). Following the assassination of Julius Caesar in 44 BC, Brutus and his co-conspirators instrumentalized this symbolism of the pileus to signify the end of Caesar's dictatorship and a return to the (Roman) republican system.

These Roman associations of the pileus with liberty and republicanism were carried forward to the 18th century, until when the pileus was confused with the Phrygian cap, then becoming a symbol of those values.

France's bonnet rouge

In revolutionary France 
In 1675, the anti-tax and anti-nobility Stamp-Paper revolt erupted in Brittany and north-western France, where it became known as the bonnets rouges uprising after the blue or red caps worn by the insurgents. Although the insurgents are not known to have preferred any particular style of cap, the name and color stuck as a symbol of revolt against the nobility and establishment. Robespierre would later object to the color, but was ignored.

The use of a Phrygian-style cap as a symbol of revolutionary France is first documented in May 1790, at a festival in Troyes adorning a statue representing the nation, and at Lyon, on a lance carried by the goddess Libertas. To this day the national allegory of France, Marianne, is shown wearing a red Phrygian cap.

By wearing the bonnet rouge and sans-culottes ("without silk breeches"), the Parisian working class made their revolutionary ardor and plebeian solidarity immediately recognizable. By mid-1791, these mocking fashion statements included the bonnet rouge as Parisian hairstyle, proclaimed by the Marquis de Villette (12 July 1791) as "the civic crown of the free man and French regeneration." On 15 July 1792, seeking to suppress the frivolity, François Christophe Kellermann, 1st Duc de Valmy, published an essay in which the Duke sought to establish the bonnet rouge as a sacred symbol that could only be worn by those with merit. The symbolic hairstyle became a rallying point and a way to mock the elaborate wigs of the aristocrats and the red caps of the bishops. On 6 November 1793, the Paris city council declared it the official hairstyle of all its members.

The bonnet rouge on a spear was proposed as a component of the national seal on 22 September 1792 during the third session of the National Convention. Following a suggestion by Gaan Coulon, the Convention decreed that convicts would not be permitted to wear the red cap, as it was consecrated as the badge of citizenship and freedom. In 1792, when Louis XVI was induced to sign a constitution, popular prints of the king were doctored to show him wearing the bonnet rouge. The bust of Voltaire was crowned with the red bonnet of liberty after a performance of his Brutus at the Comédie-Française in March 1792.

During the period of the Reign of Terror (September 1793 – July 1794), the cap was adopted defensively even by those who might be denounced as moderates or aristocrats and were especially keen to advertise their adherence to the new regime. The caps were often knitted by women known as tricoteuses, who sat beside the guillotine during public executions in Paris and supposedly continued knitting in between executions. The spire of Strasbourg Cathedral was crowned with a bonnet rouge in order to prevent it from being torn down in 1794.

During the Restoration 
In 1814, the Acte de déchéance de l'Empereur decision formally deposed the Bonapartes and restored the Bourbon regime, who in turn proscribed the bonnet rouge, La Marseillaise and Bastille Day celebrations. The symbols reappeared briefly in March–July 1815 during "Napoleon's Hundred Days", but were immediately suppressed again following the second restoration of Louis XVIII on 8 July 1815.

The symbols resurfaced again during the July Revolution of 1830, after which they were reinstated by the liberal July Monarchy of Louis Philippe I, and the revolutionary symbolsanthem, holiday, and bonnet rougebecame "constituent parts of a national heritage consecrated by the state and embraced by the public."

In modern France 
The republican associations with the bonnet rouge were adopted as the name and emblem of a French satirical republican and anarchist periodical published between 1913 and 1922 by Miguel Almereyda that targeted the Action française, a royalist, counter-revolutionary movement on the extreme right.

The anti-tax associations with the bonnet rouge were revived in October 2013, when a French tax-protest movement called the Bonnets Rouges used the red revolution-era Phrygian cap as a protest symbol. By means of large demonstrations and direct action, which included the destruction of many highway tax portals, the movement successfully forced the French government to rescind the tax.

In Revolutionary America 

In the years just prior to the Revolutionary War, Americans copied or emulated some of those prints in an attempt to visually defend their "rights as Englishmen". Later, the symbol of republicanism and anti-monarchical sentiment appeared in the United States as the headgear of Columbia, who in turn was visualized as a goddess-like female national personification of the United States and of Liberty herself. The cap reappears in association with Columbia in the early years of the republic, for example, on the obverse of the 1785 Immune Columbia pattern coin, which shows the goddess with a helmet seated on a globe holding in a right hand a furled U.S. flag topped by the liberty cap.

Starting in 1793, U.S. coinage frequently showed Columbia/Liberty wearing the cap. The anti-federalist movement likewise instrumentalized the figure, as in a cartoon from 1796 in which Columbia is overwhelmed by a huge American eagle holding a Liberty Pole under its wings. The cap's last appearance on circulating coinage was the Walking Liberty Half Dollar, which was minted through 1947 (and reused on the current bullion American Silver Eagle).

The U.S. Army has, since 1778, used a "War Office Seal" in which the motto "This We'll Defend" is displayed directly over a Phrygian cap on an upturned sword. It also appears on the state flags of West Virginia and Idaho (as part of their official seals), New Jersey, and New York, as well as the official seal of the United States Senate, the state of Iowa, the state of North Carolina (as well as the arms of its Senate,) and on the reverse side of both the Seal of Pennsylvania and the Seal of Virginia.

In 1854, when sculptor Thomas Crawford was preparing models for sculpture for the United States Capitol, then-Secretary of War Jefferson Davis insisted that a Phrygian cap not be included on a Statue of Freedom, on the grounds that "American liberty is original and not the liberty of the freed slave". The cap was not included in the final bronze version that is now in the building.

In the United Kingdom 
In the 18th century, the cap was often used in English political prints as an attribute of Liberty. In Blackburn, England, on 5 July 1819, female reformers such as Alice Kitchen attended their first reform meeting and presented the chair John Knight with a "most beautiful Cap of Liberty, made of scarlet silk or satin, lined with green, with a serpentined gold lace, terminating with a rich gold tassel.

In Latin America 

Many of the anti-colonial revolutions in Latin America were heavily inspired by the imagery and slogans of the American and French Revolutions. As a result, the cap has appeared on the coats of arms of many Latin American nations. The coat of arms of Haiti includes a Phrygian cap to commemorate that country's foundation by rebellious slaves.

The cap had also been displayed on certain Mexican coins (most notably the old 8-reales coin) through the late 19th century into the mid-20th century. Today, it is featured on the coats of arms or national flags of Argentina, Bolivia, Colombia, Cuba, El Salvador, Haiti, Nicaragua and Paraguay.

The Phrygian cap in Latin American coats of arms
Coat of arms of Argentina
Coat of arms of Bolivia
Coat of arms of Colombia
Coat of arms of Cuba
Coat of arms of El Salvador
Coat of arms of Haiti
Coat of arms of Nicaragua
Reverse side of the flag of Paraguay on the Seal of the Supreme Court

In popular culture 
In the Belgian comic franchise The Smurfs, the eponymous Smurfs are typically depicted wearing Phrygian-like caps.

Announced in November 2022, the official mascots of Paris 2024 Olympic and Paralympic Games, named The Phryges, were based on the cap.

Gallery

See also 
 List of hats and headgear
 Bashlyk
 Kolah namadi
 Pointed hat of Iron Age Eurasia
 Balaclava (clothing)
 Barretina
 Beret
 Bonnet (headgear)
 Cap
 Chullo
 Pileus (hat)
Liberty cap – a species of fungus in the family Hymenogastraceae, native to Europe the cap of which bears a close resemblance to the Phrygian cap and from which it takes its name.
 Liberty pole
 Monmouth cap
 The Smurfs

References

External links 

Caps
Costume in the French Revolution
National symbols of Argentina
National symbols of Colombia
National symbols of Cuba
National symbols of El Salvador
National symbols of Haiti
National symbols of Nicaragua
Cap
American Revolution
Pointed hats
National symbols of the United States
Medieval European costume
American Revolutionary War
History of Asian clothing
History of clothing (Western fashion)
Clothing in politics
Headgear in heraldry
Liberty symbols
Canadian fashion